Italia may refer to the following:

 Italy in Italian language and several other languages
 Roman Italy (Italia in Latin), the Italian peninsula during Roman times

People
 Italia (name), list of people and fictional characters named Italia

Places
 Italia, Florida, United States, an unincorporated community
 Italia Glacier, Alberto de Agostini National Park, Chile
 Italia Valley, King George Island, South Shetland Islands
 477 Italia, an asteroid

Military
 Italia-class ironclass, a class of two battleships built for the Italian Regia Marina (Royal Navy) in the 1870s and 1880s
 , an Italian ironclad launched in 1880 and stricken in 1921
 , an Italian battleship launched in 1937 as Littorio she was renamed Italia in 1943
 , a brigantine, active as a sail training vessel for the Italian Navy
 1st Bersaglieri Division "Italia", a World War II Italian unit
 nickname of the 29th Waffen Grenadier Division of the SS (1st Italian), a World War II German unit

Transportation
 Italia (airship), a semi-rigid airship used in a series of flights around the North Pole in 1928
 Italia Line, a passenger shipping line
 , an ocean liner converted by the French Navy to an armed boarding steamer and sunk in 1917
 , a passenger liner launched in 1928 as MS Kungsholm and renamed Italia from 1948 to 1964
 , a cruise ship launched in 1965
 Italia (yacht), a 12-metre class yacht
 Ferrari 458 Italia, a sports car first produced in 2009
 Hudson Italia, an automobile styling study and a limited production two-door compact coupé marketed in the 1954 and 1955 design years
 Triumph Italia, a sports car built between 1959 and 1962
 Italia, a sports car produced by Intermeccanica from 1966 to 1972
 Avenida Italia, a major thoroughfare in Montevideo, Uruguay
 Italia metro station, a railway station in Catania, Sicily, Italy

Music
 Italia (album), a 2007 album by Chris Botti
 "Italia" (song), a 2020 song by French rapper Jul
 "Italia", a track on the soundtrack for the 1999 film The Talented Mr. Ripley
 Italia Guitars, a guitar manufacturer

Other uses
 Italia Independent Group, a holding company
 Edifício Itália, a skyscraper in Brazil
 Deportivo Italia, a Venezuelan football club
 Italia (grape), a white table grape variety

See also
 Italia 1, Italia 2, Italian television channels
 Italy (disambiguation)
 Italian (disambiguation)